John Angus Hickman (born 10 September 1945)  is a British-French cancer pharmacologist.

Career
Honorary Professor at Manchester University, he received his Doctor of Science (DSc) in 1990 for his work in Experimental Cancer Chemotherapy. Jointly establishing and  directing the Cancer Research Campaign’s (now CRUK) Experimental Cancer Chemotherapy Group at Aston University (UK) the antitumour drug Temozolomide (Temodal), used to treat brain cancers, was discovered there by Dr Hickman with Drs Langdon and Gibson. 

In 1982 he spent 18 months in the Department of Pharmacology at Yale University where with Thomas R. Tritton he suggested that cell membrane signalling could be a target for anticancer drugs, an iconoclastic idea at that time. In 1989 he co-organised the first foreign American Association for Cancer Research Special Meeting in Cambridge UK on anticancer drugs targeting cell signalling. He moved to Manchester University’s School of Biological Sciences in 1989 as the Imperial Chemical Industries (ICI) Professor of Molecular Pharmacology where he directed a research group investigating the role of apoptosis in cancer drug sensitivity and resistance. Hickman initiated and was director of a joint laboratory with ICI Pharmaceuticals (becoming Zeneca) and the School of Biological Sciences. 

He became head of the Division of Physiology, Pharmacology and Toxicology in the School of Biological Sciences and was a co-founder of the Manchester University Biotechnology Incubator. After short sabbaticals at Northwestern University in Evanston, Oxford University and two summers periods at Woods Hole Marine Biology Laboratory, Hickman left Manchester for Paris in 1999 to head a new cancer drug discovery group at the private pharmaceutical company Servier, largely focussing on the discovery of drugs inhibiting the anti-apoptotic  proteins BCL-2 and MCL-13,14.  Retiring in 2010 he then coordinated a European Union Innovative Medicines project PREDECT investigating preclinical models that better represented the complexity of cancer. He now writes about the challenges of drug therapy for cancer, the limitations of preclinical models and the social hegemony of the pharmaceutical industry. He works with the group Consilium Scientific.

Research work
He proposed novel directions for cancer drug discovery, suggesting cell signalling as drug targets in the early 1980s and in the 1990s the investigation of the role of apoptosis (cell death) in determining the sensitivity and resistance of cancer cells to anticancer drugs. In addition to the discovery of Temodal he led teams that discovered anticancer drugs inhibiting proteins that regulate apoptosis.

Books
 Apoptosis and cancer chemotherapy. Totowa, N.J.: Humana Press. 1999. ISBN 9780896037434.
 Cancer chemotherapy. Oxford: Blackwell Scientific Publications. 1993. ISBN 9780632034413.

References

External links
 

Living people
1945 births
British pharmacologists
Alumni of King's College London
Yale School of Medicine alumni